Loöq Records is a record label founded by electronic music producers and DJs Jondi & Spesh in 1998.  Like, Jondi & Spesh, Loöq is based in San Francisco, California.  They have featured over 70 releases from such artists as Momu and Digital Witchcraft.

See also
 List of record labels

External links
Official Website

American record labels
Record labels established in 1998
Electronic music record labels